Yaşın is a Turkish-based surname. Notable people with the surname include:

 Neşe Yaşın (born 1959), Cypriot Turkish poet and author
 Özker Yaşın (1932–2011), Turkish Cypriot poet, journalist, and author

See also
Yasin (name)

Surnames of Turkish origin